Tang-e Chowgan-e Vosta (also Romanized as Tang-e Chowgān-e Vosţá; also known as Tang-e Chowgān-e Mīānī) is a village in Shapur Rural District, in the Central District of Kazerun County, Fars Province, Iran. At the 2006 census, its population was 511, in 113 families.

References 

Populated places in Kazerun County